Fred Longworth High School is a coeducational secondary school with academy status located in Tyldesley in the English county of Greater Manchester.

It was established as a girls' school by Lancashire County Council in 1964. The school became comprehensive in 1976 and was awarded Arts College status in 1998. Previously a community school administered by Wigan Metropolitan Borough Council, Fred Longworth High School converted to academy status on 1 September 2011. However the school continues to coordinate with Wigan Metropolitan Borough Council for admissions.

Fred Longworth High School offers GCSEs and BTECs as programmes of study for pupils. As well as for use for pupils, some of the school facilities are also available for hire to the local community.

Notable former pupils
Keely Hodgkinson, athlete
Ella Toone, footballer

References

External links
Fred Longworth High School official website

Secondary schools in the Metropolitan Borough of Wigan
Academies in the Metropolitan Borough of Wigan
Educational institutions established in 1964
1964 establishments in England
Tyldesley